José Garrido may refer to:

 José Antonio Garrido, Spanish professional road bicycle racer.
 José António Garrido (football), Portuguese football manager.